Jacques Dupont may refer to:
 Jacques Dupont (cyclist) (1928–2019), French racing cyclist
 Jacques Dupont (director) (1921–2013), French film director
 Jacques Dupont (politician) (1929–2002), minister of state for Monaco
 Jacques Dupont (scenographer) (1909–1978), French scenographer, theater decorator, painter and illustrator